This is a list of German television related events from 2005.

Events
1 March - Sascha Sirtl wins the fifth season of Big Brother Germany.
7 March - Deutschland sucht den Superstar season 1 participant Gracia Baur is selected to represent Germany at the 2005 Eurovision Song Contest with her song "Run & Hide". She is selected to be the fiftieth German Eurovision entry during Germany 12 Points! held at the Arena Berlin in Berlin.

Debuts

Domestic
3 January - Die Patriarchin (2005) (ZDF)
9 May - Speer und Er (2005) (ARD)

International
12 March -  Two and a Half Men (2003-2015) (Prosieben, ORF 1)
15 August -  Gordon the Garden Gnome (2005–2006) (KiKA)
3 September -  X-Men: Evolution (2000–2003) (Kabel eins)
21 November -  Being Ian (2005–2008) (KiKA)

BFBS
 Diamond Geezer (2005–2007)
 King Arthur's Disasters (2005–2006)
 The Secret of Eel Island (2005)

Television shows

1950s
Tagesschau (1952–present)

1960s
 heute (1963–present)

1970s
 heute-journal (1978–present)
 Tagesthemen (1978–present)

1980s
Wetten, dass..? (1981-2014)
Lindenstraße (1985–present)

1990s
Gute Zeiten, schlechte Zeiten (1992–present)
Marienhof (1992–2011)
Unter uns (1994–present)
Verbotene Liebe (1995-2015)
Schloss Einstein (1998–present)
In aller Freundschaft (1998–present)
Wer wird Millionär? (1999–present)

2000s
Big Brother Germany (2000-2011, 2015–present)
Deutschland sucht den Superstar (2002–present)

Ending this year

Births

Deaths

See also 
2005 in Germany